Pandercetes is a genus of huntsman spiders that was first described by Ludwig Carl Christian Koch in his 1875 treatise on Australian spiders. They are mainly distributed in tropical Asia and Australia, and are known for their cryptic coloration that matches local moss and lichen. Their legs have lateral hairs, giving them a feathery appearance, further masking their outline against tree trunks. Their head is somewhat elevated and the carapace has the thoracic region low and flat.

The genus is characterized by the internal anatomy of the reproductive structures. Males have irregular coils at the terminal end, while females have screw like copulatory ducts.

Species

 it contains sixteen species and one subspecies, found in tropical forests in Asia, extending east to Australia:
Pandercetes celatus Pocock, 1899 – India
Pandercetes celebensis Merian, 1911 – Indonesia (Sulawesi)
Pandercetes c. vulcanicola Merian, 1911 – Indonesia (Sulawesi)
Pandercetes decipiens Pocock, 1899 – India, Sri Lanka
Pandercetes gracilis L. Koch, 1875 (type) – Indonesia (Moluccas, Sulawesi), New Guinea, Australia (Queensland)
Pandercetes isopus Thorell, 1881 – Indonesia (Moluccas), New Guinea
Pandercetes longipes Thorell, 1881 – Papua New Guinea (Yule Is.)
Pandercetes macilentus Thorell, 1895 – Myanmar
Pandercetes malleator Thorell, 1890 – Malaysia, Indonesia (Aru Is.)
Pandercetes manoius Roewer, 1938 – New Guinea
Pandercetes niger Merian, 1911 – Indonesia (Sulawesi)
Pandercetes nigrogularis (Simon, 1897) – Indonesia (Java)
Pandercetes ochreus Hogg, 1922 – Vietnam
Pandercetes palliventris Strand, 1911 – New Guinea
Pandercetes peronianus (Walckenaer, 1837) – New Zealand
Pandercetes plumipes (Doleschall, 1859) – Sri Lanka, Indonesia (Ambon), New Guinea
Pandercetes plumosus Pocock, 1899 – Papua New Guinea (New Britain)

See also
 List of Sparassidae species

References

External links
 Atlas of Living Australia

Araneomorphae genera
Sparassidae
Spiders of Asia
Spiders of Australia
Taxa named by Carl Ludwig Koch